Drew Carey's Improv-A-Ganza is an improvisational comedy television program that aired in the United States on the Game Show Network (GSN). A total of 40 episodes were produced during the series' only season in 2011.

Episode table

References

Lists of American comedy television series episodes
Lists of American non-fiction television series episodes